Shah Jalal is a celebrated Sufi Muslim figure in Bengal.

Shah Jalal or Shahjalal may also refer to:

 Shahjalal International Airport, in Dhaka, Bangladesh
 Shahjalal Uposhahar, a neighborhood in Sylhet, Bangladesh
 Shah Jalal Dargah
 2004 Shah Jalal bombing
 Shahjalal University of Science and Technology
 Shah Jalal Mosque, Cardiff, Wales
 Mohamed Shah Jalal (born 1966), a Bangladeshi sprinter

See also

Shah Jalal Dakhini, a 15th-century Sufi Muslim figure of eastern Bengal